Ptičie is a village and municipality in Humenné District in the Prešov Region of north-east Slovakia.

History
In historical records the village was first mentioned in 1451.

Geography
The municipality lies at an altitude of 226 metres and covers an area of 10.453 km².
It has a population of about 615 people.

Interest
Paul Newman's mother was born in this village.

External links
 
http://www.statistics.sk/mosmis/eng/run.html

Villages and municipalities in Humenné District